James Alexander Charles Auld (July 22, 1921 – June 30, 1982) was an Ontario political figure. He represented Leeds in the Legislative Assembly of Ontario from 1954 to 1981 as a Progressive Conservative member.

Background
He was born in Toronto, the son of James Carswell Auld, and educated in Toronto and at the University of Toronto. In 1946, he married Nancy Eleanor Gilmour. Auld served as captain in the Queen's Own Rifles. He participated in the D-Day landings at Normandy in 1944. He worked as a wholesaler in Brockville.

Politics
He was a member of the town council for Brockville.

In 1954 he was elected in a by-election in the provincial riding of Leeds to replace Charles MacOdrum who had died earlier in the year. He beat Liberal candidate Mary Sheldon by over 5,000 votes. He was re-elected in every election up until his retirement in 1981, serving a total of 27 years.

He served in the provincial cabinet as Minister of Transport from 1962 to 1963, Minister of Travel and Publicity from 1963 to 1964, Minister of Tourism and Information from 1964 to 1971, Minister of Public Works from 1971 to 1972, Minister of the Environment from 1972 to 1974, Minister of Colleges and Universities from 1974 to 1975, Minister of Government Services in 1977, Minister of Energy from 1978 to 1979 and Minister of Natural Resources from 1978 to 1981. Auld was also Chair of the Management Board of Cabinet and commissioner on the Board of Internal Economy.

Cabinet positions

Later life
After his retirement from politics, he was appointed as chairman of the St. Lawrence Parks Commission in May 1981. On June 1, 1982, he was appointed as chairman of the Electoral Expenses Commission. On June 30 he was found unconscious at his desk and died later in hospital after suffering a heart attack. He was 60 years old.

References

Notes

Citations

Further reading
 Canadian Parliamentary Guide, 1977, PG Normandin

External links 
 

1921 births
1982 deaths
People from Brockville
Members of the Executive Council of Ontario
Progressive Conservative Party of Ontario MPPs
University of Toronto alumni
Canadian Army personnel of World War II
Queen's Own Rifles of Canada officers
Canadian military personnel from Ontario